Crepidodera nana, the tiny aspen flea beetle, is a species of flea beetle in the family Chrysomelidae. It is found in North America.

References

Further reading

 
 

Alticini
Articles created by Qbugbot
Beetles described in 1824
Taxa named by Thomas Say